The 1931 Haskell Indians football team was an American football that represented the Haskell Institute (now known as Haskell Indian Nations University) during the 1931 college football season. In its third year under head coach William Henry Dietz, the team compiled a 6–4 record. Louis Weller was the team captain for third consecutive season.

Schedule

References

Haskell
Haskell Indian Nations Fighting Indians football seasons
Haskell Indians football